Gan Ching Hwee (born 22 July 2003) is a Singaporean swimmer.

Education 
Gan studied at Tao Nan School and Anglo-Chinese School (Independent). She is currently studying nutrition science at Indiana University, United States.

Swimming career 
Gan competed in the women's 1500 metre freestyle at the 2019 World Aquatics Championships. She won the women's 800m freestyle in the Liberty Insurance 50th Singapore National Age Group Swimming Championships and broke her own U-17 national record at 8:42.23.

References

External links
 

2003 births
Living people
Place of birth missing (living people)
Swimmers at the 2018 Summer Youth Olympics
Swimmers at the 2018 Asian Games
Competitors at the 2019 Southeast Asian Games
Southeast Asian Games gold medalists for Singapore
Southeast Asian Games silver medalists for Singapore
Southeast Asian Games medalists in swimming
Singaporean female freestyle swimmers
Asian Games competitors for Singapore
Competitors at the 2021 Southeast Asian Games
Indiana Hoosiers women's swimmers
21st-century Singaporean women